The Silent Battle is a 1939 British thriller film directed by Herbert Mason and starring Rex Harrison, Valerie Hobson and John Loder. It is also known by the alternative titles Continental Express and Peace in our Time. It was inspired by the novel Le Poisson Chinois by Jean Bommart. Secret agents try to defeat terrorists on the Orient Express.

It is a remake of the French film The Silent Battle (1937).

Cast
 Rex Harrison as Jacques Sauvin 
 Valerie Hobson as Draguisha 
 John Loder as Bordier 
 Muriel Aked as Madame Duvivier 
 George Devine as Sonneman 
 John Salew as Ernest 
 Kaye Seeley as Bostoff 
 Carl Jaffe as Rykoff 
 Megs Jenkins as Louise 
 Arthur Maude as Editor

Critical reception
TV Guide wrote, "competent prewar spy drama with a fairly talented cast, but it doesn't pack the action or suspense of the great espionage drama Night Train to Munich (1940), also starring Harrison."

External links

 The Silent Battle at BFI
 The Silent Battle at AllMovie

References

1939 films
British thriller films
1930s thriller films
1930s English-language films
Films based on French novels
Films directed by Herbert Mason
Films produced by Anthony Havelock-Allan
Films set on the Orient Express
British remakes of French films
British black-and-white films
1930s British films